The 1986 Women's World Chess Championship was won by Maia Chiburdanidze, who successfully defended her title against challenger Elena Akhmilovskaya.

1985 Interzonals

As part of the qualification process, two Interzonal tournaments were held in June 1985, one in Havana and the other in Zeleznovodsk, featuring the best players from each FIDE zone. A total of 30 players took part, with the top three from each Interzonal qualifying for the Candidates Tournament.

In Havana, Alexandria and Akhmilovskaya took first and second place and qualified directly. Cramling took the last spot in the Candidates after winning a playoff against Ioseliani and Terescenco-Nutu.

Litinskaya won in Zeleznovodsk, ahead of Wu and Brustman; the latter only qualified after a playoff against Zaitseva.

{| class="wikitable"
|+ 1985 Women's Interzonal, Havana
|-
! !! Player !! 1 !! 2 !! 3 !! 4 !! 5 !! 6 !! 7 !! 8 !! 9 !! 10 !! 11 !! 12 !! 13 !! 14 !! Points !! Tie break
|- style="background:#ccffcc;"
| 1 ||  || - || 1 || ½ || ½ || ½ || ½ || ½ || ½ || 1 || 1 || 1 || 1 || 1 || 1 || 10 || 
|- style="background:#ccffcc;"
| 2 ||  || 0 || - || 1 || 1 || 1 || ½ || ½ || ½ || ½ || 1 || 1 || ½ || 1 || 1 || 9½ || 
|- style="background:#ccffcc;"
| 3 ||  || ½ || ½ || - || ½ || 1 || 0 || 1 || ½ || 1 || ½ || 1 || 1 || 1 || 0 || 8½ || 53.00
|-
| 4 ||  || ½ || ½ || ½ || - || 1 || ½ || 0 || 0 || 1 || 1 || 1 || 1 || ½ || 1 || 8½ || 50.00
|-
| 5 ||  || ½ || ½ || 0 || 0 || - || ½ || 1 || 1 || 1 || 1 || 0 || 1 || 1 || 1 || 8½ || 48.25
|-
| 6 ||  || ½ || 0 || 1 || ½ || ½ || - || ½ || 1 || ½ || ½ || 0 || ½ || ½ || 1 || 7 || 44.00
|-
| 7 ||  || ½ || 0 || 0 || 1 || 0 || ½ || - || ½ || 0 || 1 || 1 || ½ || 1 || 1 || 7 || 37.25
|-
| 8 ||  || ½ || 0 || ½ || 1 || 0 || 0 || ½ || - || ½ || 1 || 0 || 1 || 1 || ½ || 6½ || 38.25
|-
| 9 ||  || 0 || 0 || 0 || 0 || 0 || ½ || 1 || ½ || - || 1 || 1 || ½ || 1 || 1 || 6½ || 30.75
|-
| 10 ||  || 0 || ½ || ½ || 0 || 0 || ½ || 0 || 0 || 0 || - || 1 || 1 || 1 || 1 || 5½ || 
|-
| 11 ||  || 0 || 0 || 0 || 0 || 1 || 1 || 0 || 1 || 0 || 0 || - || 0 || ½ || ½ || 4 || 24.75
|-
| 12 ||  || 0 || ½ || 0 || 0 || 0 || ½ || ½ || 0 || ½ || 0 || 1 || - || ½ || ½ || 4 || 21.75
|-
| 13 ||  || 0 || 0 || 0 || ½ || 0 || ½ || 0 || 0 || 0 || 0 || ½ || ½ || - || 1 || 3 || 
|-
| 14 ||  || 0 || 0 || 1 || 0 || 0 || 0 || 0 || ½ || 0 || 0 || ½ || ½ || 0 || - || 2½ || 
|}

{| class="wikitable"
|+ 1985 Women's Interzonal, Zeleznovodsk
|-
! !! Player !! 1 !! 2 !! 3 !! 4 !! 5 !! 6 !! 7 !! 8 !! 9 !! 10 !! 11 !! 12 !! 13 !! 14 !! 15 !! 16 !! Points !! Tie break
|- style="background:#ccffcc;"
| 1 ||  || - || 1 || 0 || 1 || 1 || ½ || ½ || ½ || 1 || ½ || 1 || ½ || 1 || ½ || 1 || 1 || 11 || 
|- style="background:#ccffcc;"
| 2 ||  || 0 || - || ½ || 1 || 1 || 1 || 1 || 0 || 0 || ½ || 1 || 1 || ½ || 1 || 1 || 1 || 10½ || 
|- style="background:#ccffcc;"
| 3 ||  || 1 || ½ || - || 0 || ½ || 0 || 1 || ½ || 1 || 0 || 1 || 1 || 1 || ½ || 1 || 1 || 10 || 67.25
|-
| 4 ||  || 0 || 0 || 1 || - || ½ || ½ || ½ || ½ || 1 || 1 || 0 || 1 || 1 || 1 || 1 || 1 || 10 || 63.50
|-
| 5 ||  || 0 || 0 || ½ || ½ || - || 1 || 1 || ½ || 1 || ½ || 1 || ½ || ½ || 1 || ½ || 1 || 9½ || 64.75
|-
| 6 ||  || ½ || 0 || 1 || ½ || 0 || - || 0 || 1 || 1 || 1 || ½ || 1 || ½ || ½ || 1 || 1 || 9½ || 62.75
|-
| 7 ||  || ½ || 0 || 0 || ½ || 0 || 1 || - || ½ || 0 || ½ || 1 || 1 || 1 || 1 || 1 || 1 || 9 || 
|-
| 8 ||  || ½ || 1 || ½ || ½ || ½ || 0 || ½ || - || 0 || 1 || 0 || ½ || 1 || 1 || ½ || ½ || 8 || 
|-
| 9 ||  || 0 || 1 || 0 || 0 || 0 || 0 || 1 || 1 || - || 0 || 0 || ½ || 1 || 1 || 1 || 1 || 7½ || 
|-
| 10 ||  || ½ || ½ || 1 || 0 || ½ || 0 || ½ || 0 || 1 || - || 0 || 0 || 1 || ½ || 1 || ½ || 7 || 49.25
|-
| 11 ||  || 0 || 0 || 0 || 1 || 0 || ½ || 0 || 1 || 1 || 1 || - || ½ || 1 || 0 || ½ || ½ || 7 || 48.00
|-
| 12 ||  || ½ || 0 || 0 || 0 || ½ || 0 || 0 || ½ || ½ || 1 || ½ || - || 0 || 0 || 1 || 1 || 5½ || 
|-
| 13 ||  || 0 || ½ || 0 || 0 || ½ || ½ || 0 || 0 || 0 || 0 || 0 || 1 || - || 1 || 1 || ½ || 5 || 
|-
| 14 ||  || ½ || 0 || ½ || 0 || 0 || ½ || 0 || 0 || 0 || ½ || 1 || 1 || 0 || - || 0 || ½ || 4½ || 
|-
| 15 ||  || 0 || 0 || 0 || 0 || ½ || 0 || 0 || ½ || 0 || 0 || ½ || 0 || 0 || 1 || - || ½ || 3 || 18.25
|-
| 16 ||  || 0 || 0 || 0 || 0 || 0 || 0 || 0 || ½ || 0 || ½ || ½ || 0 || ½ || ½ || ½ || - || 3 || 17.25
|}

1986 Candidates Tournament

The six qualifiers from the Interzonals were joined by two seeded players: Levitina, who had lost the last championship match, and Semenova, who had lost the previous Candidates final.

In a change from the knock-out system used in the last five championship cycles, the Candidates Tournament in this cycle was contested as a double round-robin tournament in Malmö in February 1986. Even though she lost ½-1½ to both her closest competitors, Akhmilovskaya still won the tournament by half a point, earning the right to challenge the reigning champion for the title.

{| class="wikitable"
|+ 1986 Women's Candidates Tournament
|-
! !! Player !! 1 !! 2 !! 3 !! 4 !! 5 !! 6 !! 7 !! 8 !! Points !! Tie break
|- style="background:#ccffcc;"
| 1 ||  || - || ½ || ½ || 1½ || 1½ || 1½ || 2 || 2 || 9½ || 
|-
| 2 ||  || 1½ || - || 1 || 1 || 1 || 1½ || 1 || 2 || 9 || 
|-
| 3 ||  || 1½ || 1 || - || 1 || 1 || 1 || ½ || 2 || 8 || 
|-
| 4 ||  || ½ || 1 || 1 || - || 2 || ½ || 1½ || ½ || 7 || 49.50
|-
| 5 ||  || ½ || 1 || 1 || 0 || - || 1½ || 1½ || 1½ || 7 || 45.00
|-
| 6 ||  || ½ || ½ || 1 || 1½ || ½ || - || 1 || 1½ || 6½ || 
|-
| 7 ||  || 0 || 1 || 1½ || ½ || ½ || 1 || - || 1½ || 6 || 
|-
| 8 ||  || 0 || 0 || 0 || 1½ || ½ || ½ || ½ || - || 3 || 
|}

1986 Championship Match

The championship match was played in Sofia in 1986. Once again, defending champion Chiburdanidze had no real problems. She beat challenger Akhmilovskaya with a comfortable margin of three points and retained her title.

{| class="wikitable" style="text-align:center"
|+Women's World Championship Match 1986
|-
! !! 1 !! 2 !! 3 !! 4 !! 5 !! 6 !! 7 !! 8 !! 9 !! 10 !! 11 !! 12 !! 13 !! 14 !! Total
|-
| align=left | 
| 1 ||style="background:black; color:white"| ½ || ½ ||style="background:black; color:white"| ½ || 1 ||style="background:black; color:white"| ½ || 1 ||style="background:black; color:white"| 1 || 0 ||style="background:black; color:white"| ½ || ½ ||style="background:black; color:white"| ½ || ½ ||style="background:black; color:white"| ½ || 8½
|-
| align=left | 
|style="background:black; color:white"| 0 || ½ ||style="background:black; color:white"| ½ || ½ ||style="background:black; color:white"| 0 || ½ ||style="background:black; color:white"| 0 || 0 ||style="background:black; color:white"| 1 || ½ ||style="background:black; color:white"| ½ || ½ ||style="background:black; color:white"| ½ || ½ || 5½
|}

References

Women's World Chess Championships
1986 in chess